K-IV water project, abbreviated as K-IV,  is a pending water supply project from last 19 years being jointly developed by the provincial and federal governments in Karachi, Pakistan, to augment the city's daily water supply. The estimated cost was approximately Rs.25.5 billion PKR, which now increased to 150 billion PKR, while the project is designed to provide 650 million gallons of water daily to Karachi in three phases. The new water supply will be extracted from Keenjhar Lake through three water canals. The project was slated for completion in mid-2019. K-IV water project is part of Karachi Bulk Water Supply Project.

The responsibility of implementation of K4 project was handed over to WAPDA by the federal government in October 2020. The WAPDA vows to complete the K4 project in minimum time of two years so that the citizens of Karachi can benefit from it. Like many other projects for Karachi, this project is once again delayed till October 2023.

Background 
 
The project’s feasibility studies and design were completed by Osmani & Company Limited (OCL). Estimates prepared by the consultants in 2007-08 based on the preliminary designs were reviewed by different tiers of provincial and federal governments and finally the project was approved for Rs. 25.5B by ECNEC in the year 2011. Due to the negligence of federal and provincial governments during the span of last 19 years, project cost have been increased from original 25.5 billion PKR to 150 billion PKR and project work is still pending.

Design
The total length of the Phase 1 of the project is 120km, of which approximately 92km is canal, 10 km are siphons, and approximately 8 km are RCC conduits. There are 2 pump stations capable of pumping of 260 million gallons per day each, and three filtration plants - one of 130 MGD and two of 65 MGD capacity.

Construction 
Construction is being carried out by the Frontier Works Organisation conglomerate. In November 2020, after taking responsibility to execute the project,  WAPDA stopped working on K-IV project by mentioning serious technical and design issues.

See also
 Karachi
 Karachi Water and Sewerage Board
 Karachi Bulk Water Supply Project
 Water resources management in Pakistan
 Dams, water locks and canals of Pakistan
 Water supply and sanitation in Pakistan

References

Proposed infrastructure in Pakistan
Proposed water supply infrastructure
Water supply and sanitation in Pakistan